Bilheimer is a surname. Notable people with the surname include:

Robert Bilheimer (21st century), American film director, son of Robert S.
Robert S. Bilheimer (1917–2006), American theologian